3: Fresh, Fri, Fly is the third studio album by the Danish Pop duo Nik & Jay.

Track listing
"Alt Hvad Du Gør Mig Til"
"Boing!"
"Når Et Lys Slukkes"
"I Love Ya"
"Nu Er Det For Sent"
"Fresh, Fri, Fly"
"Årstiderne Skifter"
"Op På Hesten"
"Et Sidste Kys"
"Gi'r Dig Mer'"
"Vidne Til Det Hele"

Charts
The album reached #2 in the Danish Albums Chart and went 3 times platinum.

Singles
Five singles were released from the album: "Boing!", "Når et lys slukkes" and "I Love Ya" in 2006 and "Et sidste kys" and "Op på hesten" in 2007. "Boing!" and "Et sidste kys" both made to #2 in the Danish Singles Chart and "Når et lys slukkes" made it to #4.

References

2006 albums
Nik & Jay albums